James Fenton (born 1949) is a British poet (in English), journalist and literary critic.

James Fenton may also refer to:

 James Fenton (farmer) (1820–1901), Irish-born Australian, also non-fiction writer
 James Fenton (Ulster Scots poet) (born 1931), British, writing in his dialect 
 James Fenton (engineer) (1815–1863), Scottish born mechanical engineer
 James Fenton (politician) (1864–1950), Australian politician
 James Fenton (1754–1834), financial partner in Fenton, Murray and Jackson